Eupempelus is a genus of beetles in the family Cerambycidae, containing the following species:

 Eupempelus illuminus Mermudes & Napp, 2001
 Eupempelus olivaceus Bates, 1870
 Eupempelus spinithorax Mermudes & Napp, 2001

References

Heteropsini